Ambatolampy Tsimahafotsy is a town in Analamanga Region, in the  Central Highlands of Madagascar, located at 16 km from the capital of Antananarivo.

Education
In the commune are located:
5 primary schools
1 college
10 private schools

References

Populated places in Analamanga